Saint-Romain-sous-Gourdon (literally Saint-Romain under Gourdon) is a commune in the Saône-et-Loire department in the region of Bourgogne-Franche-Comté in eastern France.

It is 45 km south west of Chalon-sur-Saône, 25 km due south of Le Creusot and 6 km south east of Montceau-les-Mines.

See also
Communes of the Saône-et-Loire department

References

Communes of Saône-et-Loire